Oasis are a britpop band formed in Manchester by Liam Gallagher (vocals), Paul Arthurs (guitar), Paul McGuigan (bass) and Tony McCarroll (drums), who were soon joined by Liam's older brother Noel Gallagher (guitar, vocals).

The band released seven studio albums: Definitely Maybe (1994), (What's the Story) Morning Glory? (1995), Be Here Now (1997), Standing on the Shoulder of Giants (2000), Heathen Chemistry (2002), Don't Believe the Truth (2005) and Dig Out Your Soul (2008). The band's second studio album, (What's the Story) Morning Glory, has been their highest-selling album to date, with over 22 million copies sold worldwide the album was also voted Best Album of 30 Years at the 2010 Brit Awards.

Brit Awards
The Brit Awards are the British Phonographic Industry's annual pop music awards. Oasis have received six awards from eighteen nominations.

|-
|rowspan="4"|1995
|rowspan="2"|Oasis
|British Breakthrough Act
|
|-
|British Group
|
|-
|Definitely Maybe
|British Album of the Year
|
|-
|"Live Forever"
|British Single of the Year
|
|-
|rowspan="5"|1996
|Oasis
|British Group
|
|-
|(What's the Story) Morning Glory?
|British Album of the Year
|
|-
|rowspan="2"|"Wonderwall"
|British Video of the Year
|
|-
|British Single of the Year
|
|-
|"Roll with It"
|British Single of the Year
|
|-
|1997
|"Don't Look Back in Anger"
|British Single of the Year
|
|-
|rowspan="3"|1998
|Oasis
|British Group
|
|-
|Be Here Now
|British Album of the Year
|
|-
|"D'You Know What I Mean?"
|British Video of the Year
|
|-
|2003
|Oasis
|British Group
|
|-
|rowspan="2"|2006
|rowspan="2"|Oasis
|British Rock Act
|
|-
|British Live Act
|
|-
|2007
|Oasis
|Outstanding Contribution to Music
|
|-
|2010
|(What's the Story) Morning Glory?
|British Album of 30 Year
|

Grammy Awards
The Grammy Awards are presented annually by the National Academy of Recording Arts and Sciences of the United States for outstanding achievements in the record industry. Oasis have received three nominations.

|-
| rowspan="2" | 1997 || rowspan="2" | "Wonderwall" || Best Rock Vocal Performance by a Duo or Group || 
|-
| Best Rock Song || 
|-
| 1999 || "All Around the World" || Best Music Video, Short-Form ||

Hong Kong Top Sales Music Awards
 
|-
| 2002 || Heathen Chemistry || Top 10 Best Selling Foreign Albums || 
|-

Ivor Novello Awards
The Ivor Novello Awards, named after the Cardiff born entertainer Ivor Novello, are awards for songwriting and composing. Oasis have received two award from three nominations.

|-
| 1995 || Oasis || Songwriters of the Year || 
|-
| 1996 || Noel Gallagher || Songwriters of the Year || * 
|-
| 2003 || "Stop Crying Your Heart Out" || Best Song Musically and Lyrically || 

 Refused because it was to be shared with Damon Albarn

Juno Awards
The Juno Awards are presented annually to Canadian musical artists and bands to acknowledge their artistic and technical achievements in all aspects of music. New members of the Canadian Music Hall of Fame are also inducted as part of the awards ceremonies.

|-
| 1997
| (What's the Story) Morning Glory?
| Best Selling Album (Foreign or Domestic)
|

Mercury Prizes
The Mercury Prize is an annual music prize awarded for the best album from the United Kingdom or Ireland. Oasis have received two nominations.

|-
| 1995 || Definitely Maybe || Mercury Prize || 
|-
| 1996 || (What's the Story) Morning Glory? || Mercury Prize ||

MTV Asia Awards
The biannual MTV Asia Awards is the Asian equivalent of the Australian MTV Australia Awards. Oasis have received one nomination.

|-
| 2006 || Oasis || Favourite Rock Act ||

MTV Europe Music Awards
The MTV Europe Music Award were established in 1994 by MTV Europe to celebrate the most popular music videos in Europe. Oasis have received three awards from seven nominations.

|-
| 1995 || Oasis || Best Rock || 
|-
| rowspan="4" | 1996 || "Don't Look Back in Anger" || MTV Select || 
|-
| "Wonderwall" || Best Song || 
|-
| rowspan="2" | Oasis || Best Group || 
|-
| Best Rock || 
|-
| rowspan="2" | 1997 || rowspan="2" | Oasis || Best Group || 
|-
| Best Rock ||

MTV Video Music Awards Japan
The MTV Video Music Awards Japan were established in 2002 by MTV Japan. Oasis have received one award from four nominations.

|-
| 2002 || Oasis || Best Live Act || 
|-
| rowspan="3" | 2006 || rowspan="2" | "Lyla" || Best Group Video || 
|-
| Best Video of the Year || 
|-
| Don't Believe the Truth || Best Album of the Year ||

NME Awards
The NME Awards are an annual music awards show, founded by the music magazine NME. Oasis have received Seventeen awards from twenty-six nominations.

|-
| rowspan="3" | 1995 || "Live Forever" || Single of the Year || 
|-
| Definitely Maybe || Album of the Year || 
|-
| Oasis || Best New Band || 
|-
| rowspan="4" | 1996 || "Wonderwall" || Best Single || 
|-
| (What's the Story) Morning Glory? || Best Album || 
|-
| rowspan="2" | Oasis || Best Live Band || 
|-
| Best Band || 
|-
| rowspan="2" | 1997 || Knebworth || Best Musical Event || 
|-
| Oasis || Band of the Year || 
|-
| rowspan="3" | 2003 || rowspan="3" | Oasis || Best Live Band || 
|-
| Best UK Band || 
|-
| Artist of the Year || 
|-
| 2005 || Definitely Maybe || Best Music DVD || 
|-
| rowspan="5" | 2006 || rowspan="2" | "The Importance of Being Idle" || Best Video || 
|-
| Best British Track || 
|-
| Don't Believe the Truth || Best Album || 
|-
| rowspan="2" | Oasis || Best British Band || 
|-
| Best Live Act || 
|-
| 2007 || Oasis || Best British Band || 
|-
| rowspan="5" | 2009 || rowspan="3" | Oasis || Best British Band || 
|-
| Best Live Band || 
|-
| Best Band Blog || 
|-
| Dig Out Your Soul || Best Album || 
|-
| "The Shock of the Lightning" || Best Video || 
|-
| rowspan="2" | 2017 || | "Oasis: Supersonic" ||Best Music Film || 
|-
| Be Here Now || Best Reissue ||

NME Awards USA
The NME Awards USA are awarded annually by music magazine NME. Oasis have received two nominations.

|-
| rowspan="2" | 2008 || "Lord Don't Slow Me Down" || Best Video || 
|-
| Oasis || Best International Band ||

Q Awards
The Q Awards are the UK's annual music awards run by the music magazine Q. Oasis have received nine awards from nineteen nominations.

|-
| 1994 || Oasis || Best New Act || 
|-
| 1995 || Oasis || Best Live Act || 
|-
| 1996 || Oasis || Best Act in the World Today || 
|-
| rowspan="2" | 1997 || rowspan="2" | Oasis || Best Act in the World Today || 
|-
| Best Live Act || 
|-
| 2000 || Oasis || Best Live Act || 
|-
| rowspan="3" | 2002 || "The Hindu Times" || Best Single || 
|-
| rowspan="2" | Oasis || Best Live Act || 
|-
| Best Act in the World Today || 
|-
| rowspan="6" | 2005 || rowspan="2" | "The Importance of Being Idle" || Best Video || 
|-
| Best Track|| 
|-
| Don't Believe the Truth || Best Album || 
|-
| rowspan="3" | Oasis || Best Live Act || 
|-
| Best Act in the World Today || 
|-
| People's Choice Award || 
|-
| rowspan=2|2006 || Oasis || Best Act in the World Today || 
|-
| Noel Gallagher || Classic Songwriter Award ||   
|-
| 2008 || Oasis || Best Act in the World Today || 
|-
| rowspan="2" | 2009 || rowspan="2" | Oasis || Best Live Act|| 
|-
| Best Act in the World Today ||

Silver Clef Awards
Oasis have received one award from one nomination.

|-
| 2008 || Oasis || Silver Clef ||

Top of the Pops Awards
The Top of the Pops Awards were awarded annually by television programme Top of the Pops. Oasis have received one award from one nomination.

|-
| 2002 || Oasis || Best Rock Act ||

Vodafone Live Music Awards
The Vodafone Live Music Awards are awarded annually by mobile telecommunications company Vodafone. Oasis have received one award from one nomination.

|-
| 2007 || Morning Glory – An Album Under Review || Best Live Music DVD ||

UK Music Video Awards
Oasis have received two awards from four nominations.

|-
| rowspan="4" | 2009 || rowspan="3" | "Falling Down" || Best Cinematography In A Video || 
|-
| Best Editing in a Video || 
|-
| Best Rock Video || 
|-
| 'Dig Out Your Soul' || The Innovation Award ||

UK Festival Awards
The UK Festival Awards are an annual music awards show, Oasis have received one nomination.

|-
| 2009 || Oasis || Best Headline Performance ||

Webby Awards
A Webby Award is an award for excellence on the Internet presented annually by The International Academy of Digital Arts and Sciences. 

|-
| 2009 
| Dig Out Your Soul - In The Streets
| Online Film & Video - Music 
|

World Music Awards

!Ref.
|-
| rowspan=3|1997
| rowspan=3|Themselves
| World's Best Selling Rock Group
| 
| rowspan=3|
|-
| World's Best Selling Alternative Group
| 
|-
| World's Best Selling British Artist
|

Recognition 
In July 2009, "Wonderwall" was voted #12 in Triple J Hottest 100 of All Time.

References 

Awards
Lists of awards received by British musician
Lists of awards received by musical group